Gmina Chrząstowice, German: Gemeinde Chronstau is a rural gmina (administrative district) in Opole County, Opole Voivodeship, in south-western Poland.

The gmina is officially bilingual (Polish and German), a significant German community having remained behind after the area was transferred to Poland from Germany in 1945.

History
In the Middle Ages, the area belonged to the Kingdom of Poland, with occasional periods of Bohemian rule. After the feudal fragmentation of Poland it had a certain amount of autonomy, before becoming part of the Habsburg Empire in 1526. In the second half of the 17th century it again briefly came under Polish rule, before returning to the Habsburgs. After the War of Austrian succession the area, along with rest of Silesia was taken by Kingdom of Prussia, and was part of it and its successor states; the gmina was located in the former German Province of Lower Silesia. After World War II, the area became part of Poland again.

Villages
The commune contains the villages and settlements of: Chrząstowice, Dąbrowice, Daniec, Dębie, Dębska Kuźnia, Falmirowice, Lędziny, Niwki and Suchy Bór.

Neighbouring gminas
Gmina Chrząstowice is bordered by the city of Opole and by the gminas of Izbicko, Ozimek, Tarnów Opolski and Turawa.

Twin towns – sister cities

Gmina Chrząstowice is twinned with:
 Glashütte, Germany
 Zátor, Czech Republic

References

Chrzastowice
Opole County
Bilingual communes in Poland